Vincent Dumestre (born 5 May 1968) is a French lutenist. In 1997 he founded the ensemble Le Poème Harmonique.

He studied the classical guitar at the École Normale de Musique de Paris and art history at the École du Louvre. Afterwards he dedicated himself to the music for theorbo, baroque guitar and lute, studying with Hopkinson Smith and Eugène Ferré.

In 2005, he received the Grand Prix du Disque of the L'Académie Charles Cros in the category "baroque music" for Bourgeois Gentilhomme.

References

External links 
 Vincent Dumestre (Le Poème Harmonique)

1968 births
Living people
French male conductors (music)
French lutenists
French performers of early music
École Normale de Musique de Paris alumni
Chevaliers of the Ordre des Arts et des Lettres
French classical guitarists
French male guitarists
École du Louvre alumni
21st-century French conductors (music)
21st-century French male musicians